

Events

Pre-1600
1066 – Following the death of Harold II at the Battle of Hastings, Edgar the Ætheling is proclaimed King of England by the Witan; he is never crowned, and concedes power to William the Conqueror two months later.
1211 – Battle of the Rhyndacus: The Latin emperor Henry of Flanders defeats the Nicaean emperor Theodore I Laskaris.
1529 – The Siege of Vienna ends when Austria routs the invading Ottoman forces, ending its European expansion.
1582 – Adoption of the Gregorian calendar begins, eventually leading to near-universal adoption.

1601–1900
1783 – The Montgolfier brothers' hot air balloon makes the first human ascent, piloted by Jean-François Pilâtre de Rozier.
1793 – Queen Marie Antoinette of France is tried and convicted of treason.
1815 – Napoleon begins his exile on Saint Helena in the South Atlantic Ocean.
1863 – American Civil War: The H. L. Hunley, the first submarine to sink a ship, sinks, killing its inventor.
1864 – American Civil War: The Union garrison of Glasgow, Missouri surrenders to Confederate forces.
1878 – The Edison Electric Light Company begins operation.
1888 – The "From Hell" letter allegedly sent by Jack the Ripper is received by investigators.

1901–present
1910 – Airship America is launched from New Jersey in the first attempt to cross the Atlantic by a powered aircraft.
1923 – The German Rentenmark is introduced in Germany to counter hyperinflation in the Weimar Republic.
1928 – The airship Graf Zeppelin completes its first trans-Atlantic flight, landing at Lakehurst, New Jersey, United States.
1932 – Tata Airlines (later to become Air India) makes its first flight.
1939 – The New York Municipal Airport (later renamed LaGuardia Airport) is dedicated.
1940 – President Lluís Companys of Catalonia is executed by the Francoist government.
1944 – World War II: Germany replaces the Hungarian government after Hungary announces an armistice with the Soviet Union.
1951 – Mexican chemist Luis E. Miramontes completes the synthesis of norethisterone, the basis of an early oral contraceptive.
1954 – Hurricane Hazel devastates the eastern seaboard of North America, killing 95 and causing massive floods as far north as Toronto.
1956 – FORTRAN, the first modern computer language, is first shared with the coding community.
1965 – Vietnam War: A draft card is burned during an anti-war rally by the Catholic Worker Movement, resulting in the first arrest under a new law.
1966 – The Black Panther Party is created by Huey P. Newton and Bobby Seale.
1970 – During the construction of Australia's West Gate Bridge, a span of the bridge falls and kills 35 workers. The incident is the country's worst industrial accident to this day.
1979 – Supporters of the Malta Labour Party ransack and destroy the Times of Malta building and other locations associated with the Nationalist Party.
  1979   – A coup d'état in El Salvador overthrows President Carlos Humberto Romero and begins the 12 year-long Salvadoran Civil War.
1987 – Aero Trasporti Italiani Flight 460 crashes near Conca di Crezzo, Italy, killing all 37 people on board.
1987 – A coup d'état in Burkina Faso overthrows and kills then President Thomas Sankara.
1989 – Wayne Gretzky becomes the all-time leading points scorer in the NHL.
1990 – Soviet Union leader Mikhail Gorbachev is awarded the Nobel Peace Prize for his efforts to lessen Cold War tensions and open up his nation.
1991 – The "Oh-My-God particle", an ultra-high-energy cosmic ray measured at 40,000,000 times that of the highest energy protons produced in a particle accelerator, is observed at the University of Utah HiRes observatory in Dugway Proving Ground, Utah.
  1991   – The leaders of the Baltic States, Arnold Rüütel of Estonia, Anatolijs Gorbunovs of Latvia and Vytautas Landsbergis of Lithuania, signed the OSCE Final Act in Helsinki, Finland.
1994 – The United States, under the Clinton administration, returns Haiti's first democratically elected president, Jean-Bertrand Aristide, to the island.
1997 – The Cassini probe launches from Cape Canaveral on its way to Saturn.
2001 – NASA's Galileo spacecraft passes within  of Jupiter's moon Io.
2003 – China launches Shenzhou 5, its first manned space mission.
2006 – The 6.7  Kiholo Bay earthquake rocks Hawaii, causing property damage, injuries, landslides, power outages, and the closure of Honolulu International Airport.
2007 – Seventeen activists in New Zealand are arrested in the country's first post-9/11 anti-terrorism raids.
2008 – The Dow Jones Industrial Average closes down 733.08 points, or 7.87%, the second worst percentage drop in the Dow's history.
2013 – The 7.2  Bohol earthquake strikes the Philippines. At least 215 were killed.
2016 – One hundred and ninety-seven nations amend the Montreal Protocol to include a phase-out of hydrofluorocarbons.
2018 – 13-year-old American girl, Jayme Closs, is kidnapped from her Barron, Wisconsin home after her parents were both murdered.

Births

Pre-1600
99 BC (probable) – Lucretius, Roman poet and philosopher (d. 55 BCE)
70 BC – Virgil, Roman poet (d. 19 BC)
1265 – Temür Khan, Emperor Chengzong of Yuan (d. 1307)
1440 – Henry III, Landgrave of Upper Hesse, German noble (d. 1483)
1471 – Konrad Mutian, German epigrammatist and academic (d. 1526)
1542 – Akbar, Mughal emperor (d. 1605)
1561 – Richard Field, English cathedral dean (d. 1616)
1564 – Henry Julius, Duke of Brunswick-Lüneburg (d. 1613)
1599 – Cornelis de Graeff, Dutch mayor and regent of Amsterdam (d. 1664)

1601–1900
1608 – Evangelista Torricelli, Italian physicist and mathematician (d. 1647)
1622 – Magnus Gabriel De la Gardie, Swedish statesman and military man (d. 1686)
1686 – Allan Ramsay, Scottish poet and playwright (d. 1758)
1701 – Marie-Marguerite d'Youville, Canadian nun and saint, founded Grey Nuns (d. 1771)
1711 – Elisabeth Therese of Lorraine (d. 1741)
1762 – Samuel Adams Holyoke, American composer and educator (d. 1820)
1767 – Gabriel Richard, French-born American Roman Catholic priest, missionary, educator, and politician (d. 1832)
1775 – Bernhard Crusell, Finnish composer (d. 1838)
1784 – Thomas Robert Bugeaud, French general and politician, Governor-General of Algeria (d. 1849)
1785 – José Miguel Carrera, Chilean general and politician (d. 1821)
1789 – William Christopher Zeise, Danish chemist who prepared Zeise's salt, one of the first organometallic compounds (d. 1847)
1802 – Louis-Eugène Cavaignac, French general and politician, head of state of France in 1848 (d. 1857)
1814 – Mikhail Lermontov, Russian author, poet, and painter (d. 1841)
1816 – John Robertson, English-Australian politician, 5th Premier of New South Wales (d. 1891)
1818 – Alexander Dreyschock, Czech pianist and composer (d. 1869)
1825 – Marie of Prussia (d. 1889)
1829 – Asaph Hall, American astronomer and academic (d. 1907)
1833 – John Alexander MacPherson, Australian politician, 7th Premier of Victoria (d. 1894)
1836 – James Tissot, French painter and illustrator (d. 1902)
1840 – Honoré Mercier, Canadian journalist, lawyer, and politician, 9th Premier of Quebec (d. 1894)
1844 – Friedrich Nietzsche, German composer, poet, and philosopher (d. 1900)
1858 – John L. Sullivan, American boxer, actor, and journalist (d. 1918)
1865 – Charles W. Clark, American singer and educator (d. 1925)
1872 – Wilhelm Miklas, Austrian educator and politician, 3rd President of Austria (d. 1956)
  1872   – August Nilsson, Swedish pole vaulter, shot putter, and tug of war competitor (d. 1921)
1874 – Alfred, Hereditary Prince of Saxe-Coburg and Gotha (d. 1899)
1878 – Paul Reynaud, French lawyer and politician, 118th Prime Minister of France (d. 1966)
1879 – Jane Darwell, American actress (d. 1967)
1881 – P. G. Wodehouse, English novelist and playwright (d. 1975)
1882 – Charley O'Leary, American baseball player and coach (d. 1941)
1884 – Archibald Hoxsey, American pilot (d. 1910)
1887 – Frederick Fleet, English sailor (d. 1965)
1888 – S. S. Van Dine, American author and critic (d. 1939)
1890 – Álvaro de Campos, Portuguese poet and engineer (d. 1935)
1893 – Carol II of Romania (d. 1953)
1894 – Moshe Sharett, Ukrainian-Israeli lieutenant and politician, 2nd Prime Minister of Israel (d. 1965)
1897 – Johannes Sikkar, Estonian soldier and politician, Prime Minister of Estonia in exile (d. 1960)
1899 – Adolf Brudes, Polish-German racing driver (d. 1986)
1900 – Mervyn LeRoy, American actor, director, and producer (d. 1987)

1901–present
1901 – Enrique Jardiel Poncela, Spanish playwright and novelist (d. 1952)
1905 – C. P. Snow, English chemist and author (d. 1980)
1906 – Hiram Fong, American soldier and politician (d. 2004)
  1906   – Alicia Patterson, American journalist and publisher, co-founded Newsday (d. 1963)
  1906   – Victoria Spivey, American singer-songwriter and pianist (d. 1976)
1907 – Varian Fry, American journalist and author (d. 1967)
1908 – Herman Chittison, American pianist (d. 1967)
  1908   – John Kenneth Galbraith, Canadian-American economist and diplomat, 7th United States Ambassador to India (d. 2006)
1909 – Jesse L. Greenstein, American astronomer and academic (d. 2002)
  1909   – Robert Trout, American journalist (d. 2000)
1910 – Edwin O. Reischauer, Japanese-American scholar and diplomat, United States Ambassador to Japan (d. 1990)
1912 – Nellie Lutcher, American singer and pianist (d. 2007)
1913 – Wolfgang Lüth, German commander (d. 1945)
1914 – Mohammed Zahir Shah, Afghan king (d. 2007)
1916 – Al Killian, American trumpet player and bandleader (d. 1950)
  1916   – George Turner, Australian author and critic (d. 1997)
1917 – Jan Miner, American actress (d. 2004)
  1917   – Arthur M. Schlesinger Jr., American historian and critic (d. 2007)
  1917   – Paul Tanner, American trombonist and educator (d. 2013)
1919 – Malcolm Ross, American captain, balloonist, and physicist (d. 1985)
  1919   – Chuck Stevenson, American race car driver (d. 1995)
1920 – Chris Economaki, American sportscaster and actor (d. 2012)
  1920   – Patricia Jessel, Hong Kong-English actress (d. 1968)
  1920   – Peter Koch, American industrial engineer and wood scientist (d. 1998)
  1920   – Mario Puzo, American author and screenwriter (d. 1999)
  1920   – Henri Verneuil, Turkish-French director, producer, and screenwriter (d. 2002)
1921 – Angelica Rozeanu, Romanian-Israeli table tennis player (d. 2006)
1922 – Agustina Bessa-Luís, Portuguese author (d. 2019)
  1922   – Preben Munthe, Norwegian economist and politician, State Conciliator of Norway (d. 2013)
1923 – Italo Calvino, Italian novelist, short story writer, and journalist (d. 1985)
  1923   – Antonio Fontán, Spanish journalist and politician (d. 2010)
  1923   – Eugene Patterson, American journalist and activist (d. 2013)
  1923   – Lindsay Thompson, Australian politician, 40th Premier of Victoria (d. 2008)
1924 – Marguerite Andersen, German-Canadian author and educator (d. 2022)
  1924   – Lee Iacocca, American businessman and author (d. 2019)
  1924   – Warren Miller, American director and screenwriter (d. 2018)
1925 – Mickey Baker, American-French guitarist (d. 2012)
  1925   – Aurora Bautista, Spanish actress (d. 2012)
  1925   – Tony Hart, English painter and television host (d. 2009)
1926 – James E. Akins, American soldier and diplomat, United States Ambassador to Saudi Arabia (d. 2010)
  1926   – Agustín García Calvo, Spanish philosopher and poet (d. 2012)
  1926   – Michel Foucault, French historian and philosopher (d. 1984)
  1926   – Ed McBain, American author and screenwriter (d. 2005)
  1926   – Jean Peters, American actress (d. 2000)
  1926   – Karl Richter, German organist and conductor (d. 1981)
1927 – B. S. Abdur Rahman, Indian businessman and philanthropist (d. 2015)
1929 – Will Insley, American painter and architect (d. 2011)
1930 – FM-2030, Belgian-Iranian basketball player, philosopher and diplomat (d. 2000)
1931 – A. P. J. Abdul Kalam, Indian engineer, academic, and politician, 11th President of India (d. 2015)
  1931   – Pauline Perry, Baroness Perry of Southwark, English academic and politician
1932 – Jaan Rääts, Estonian guitarist and composer (d. 2020)
1933 – Nicky Barnes, American drug lord (d. 2012)
1934 – Alan Elsdon, English trumpet player (d. 2016)
  1934   – N. Ramani, Indian flute player (d. 2015)
1935 – Barry McGuire, American singer-songwriter and guitarist 
  1935   – Dick McTaggart, Scottish boxer
  1935   – Bobby Morrow, American sprinter (d. 2020)
  1935   – Willie O'Ree, Canadian ice hockey player
1936 – Michel Aumont, French actor (d. 2019)
  1936   – Robert Baden-Powell, 3rd Baron Baden-Powell, South African-English businessman (d. 2019)
1937 – Linda Lavin, American actress and singer
1938 – Marv Johnson, American singer-songwriter and pianist (d. 1993)
  1938   – Brice Marden, American painter
  1938   – Robert Ward, American guitarist and songwriter (d. 2008)
  1938   – Fela Kuti, Nigerian musician and activist (d. 1997)
1940 – Tommy Bishop, English rugby league player and coach
  1940   – Peter C. Doherty, Australian surgeon and immunologist, Nobel Prize laureate
1941 – Roy Masters, Australian rugby league coach, journalist, and author
1942 – Hilo Chen, Taiwanese-American painter
  1942   – Harold W. Gehman, Jr., American admiral
  1942   – Don Stevenson, American singer-songwriter and drummer
1943 – Penny Marshall, American actress, director, and producer (d. 2018)
1944 – Sali Berisha, Albanian cardiologist and politician, 2nd President of Albania
  1944   – A. Chandranehru, Sri Lankan Tamil merchant seaman and politician (d. 2005)
  1944   – Haim Saban, Israeli-American businessman, co-founded Saban Entertainment
  1944   – David Trimble, Northern Irish lawyer and politician, 3rd First Minister of Northern Ireland, Nobel Prize laureate (d. 2022)
1945 – Steve Camacho, Guyanese cricketer (d. 2015)
  1945   – Antonio Cañizares Llovera, Spanish cardinal
  1945   – Neophyte of Bulgaria, Bulgarian patriarch
  1945   – Jim Palmer, American baseball player and sportscaster
1946 – Victor Banerjee, Indian actor and director
  1946   – Richard Carpenter, American singer-songwriter and pianist
  1946   – Palle Danielsson, Swedish bassist and composer
  1946   – Stewart Stevenson, Scottish engineer and politician, Minister for Environment and Climate Change
1947 – Hümeyra, Turkish singer-songwriter and actress
  1947   – Jaroslav Erno Šedivý, Czech drummer
1948 – Renato Corona, Filipino lawyer and jurist, 23rd Chief Justice of the Supreme Court of the Philippines (d. 2016)
  1948   – Chris de Burgh, British-Irish singer-songwriter and pianist
1949 – Laurie McBain, American author
  1949   – Prannoy Roy, Indian journalist, economist, and broadcaster, founded NDTV
1950 – Candida Royalle, American porn actress, director, and producer (d. 2015)
1951 – Peter Richardson, English actor, director, and screenwriter
  1951   – Roscoe Tanner, American tennis player
  1951   – Rafael Vaganian, Armenian chess player
1953 – Betsy Clifford, Canadian skier
  1953   – Tito Jackson, American singer-songwriter and guitarist 
  1953   – Peter Phillips, English conductor and musicologist
1954 – Peter Bakowski, Australian poet and educator
  1954   – Steve Bracks, Australian politician, 44th Premier of Victoria 
  1954   – Jere Burns, American actor
  1954   – Julia Yeomans, English physicist and academic
1955 – Kulbir Bhaura, Indian field hockey player
  1955   – Emma Chichester Clark, English author and illustrator
1957 – Michael Caton-Jones, Scottish actor, director, and producer
  1957   – Mira Nair, Indian-American actress, director, and producer
  1957   – Stacy Peralta, American skateboarder, director, producer, and businessman, co-founded Powell Peralta
1958 – Stephen Clarke, English-French journalist and author
1959 – Sarah, Duchess of York
  1959   – Emeril Lagasse, American chef and author
  1959   – Alex Paterson, English keyboard player 
  1959   – Todd Solondz, American actor, director, and screenwriter
1961 – Vyacheslav Butusov, Russian singer-songwriter and guitarist 
1963 – Stanley Menzo, Dutch footballer and manager
1964 – Roberto Vittori, Italian colonel, pilot, and astronaut
1965 – Nasser El Sonbaty, German bodybuilder and trainer (d. 2013)
1966 – Jorge Campos, Mexican footballer and manager
  1966   – Bill Charlap, American pianist and composer 
  1966   – Ilse Huizinga, Dutch singer
  1966   – Dave Stead, English drummer 
1967 – Götz Otto, German actor and screenwriter
  1967   – Dan Forest, American politician, 34th Lieutenant Governor of North Carolina
1968 – Didier Deschamps, French footballer and manager
  1968   – Vanessa Marcil, American actress
  1968   – Rod Wishart, Australian rugby league player
  1968   – Trent Zimmerman, Australian politician
1969 – Vítor Baía, Portuguese footballer
  1969   – Dominic West, English actor and director
1970 – Eric Benét, American musician
  1970   – Ginuwine, American singer-songwriter, dancer, and actor
  1970   – Pernilla Wiberg, Swedish skier
1971 – Joey Abs, American wrestler
  1971   – Andy Cole, English footballer and coach
  1971   – Lauri Pilter, Estonian author and translator
1972 – Fred Hoiberg, American basketball player and coach
  1972   – Matt Keeslar, American actor
  1972   – Michél Mazingu-Dinzey, German-Congolese footballer and manager
1973 – Aleksandr Filimonov, Russian footballer 
  1973   – Maria Hjorth, Swedish golfer
1974 – Ömer Çatkıç, Turkish footballer
  1974   – Bianca Rinaldi, Brazilian actress
1975 – Alessandro Doga, Italian footballer
  1975   – Glen Little, English footballer and manager
1976 – Christian Allen, American video game designer
  1976   – Manuel Dallan, Italian rugby player
1977 – Masato Kawabata, Japanese racing driver
  1977   – David Trezeguet, French footballer
  1977   – Patricio Urrutia, Ecuadorian footballer
1978 – Devon Gummersall, American actor, director, and screenwriter
  1978   – Takeshi Morishima, Japanese wrestler
1979 – Blue Adams, American football player and coach
  1979   – Bohemia, Pakistani-American rapper and producer
  1979   – Jekaterina Golovatenko, Estonian figure skater
  1979   – Paul Robinson, English footballer
  1979   – Jaci Velasquez, American singer-songwriter and actress
  1979   – Māris Verpakovskis, Latvian footballer
1980 – Tom Boonen, Belgian cyclist
1981 – Keyshia Cole, American singer-songwriter and producer
  1981   – Elena Dementieva, Russian tennis player
1983 – Stephy Tang, Hong Kong singer 
1984 – Izale McLeod, English footballer
  1984   – Johan Voskamp, Dutch footballer
  1984   – Jessie Ware, English singer-songwriter
1985 – Arron Afflalo, American basketball player
  1985   – Walter Alberto López, Uruguayan footballer
  1985   – Marcos Martínez, Spanish racing driver
1986 – Lee Donghae, South Korean singer-songwriter 
  1986   – Carlo Janka, Swiss skier
  1986   – Nolito, Spanish footballer 
1987 – Ott Tänak, Estonian racing driver
1988 – Lassy Mbouity, Congolese writer and politician
  1988   – Mesut Özil, German footballer
1989 – Leandro Antonio Martínez, Argentinian-Italian footballer
  1989   – Anthony Joshua, British professional boxer
1990 – Jeon Ji-yoon, South Korean singer-songwriter and dancer 
1995 – Jakob Pöltl, Austrian basketball player
1995 – Jack Flaherty, American baseball player
1996 – Zelo, South Korean rapper and dancer
  1996   – Charly Musonda, Belgian footballer
1999 – Bailee Madison, American actress

Deaths

Pre-1600
 412 – Theophilus, Patriarch of Alexandria
 892 – Al-Mu'tamid, Muslim caliph of the Abbasid Caliphate
 898 – Lambert of Italy (b. 880)
 912 – Abdullah ibn Muhammad al-Umawi, Spanish emir (b. 844)
 925 – Rhazes, Persian polymath (b. 864)
 961 – Abd-al-Rahman III, caliph of Córdoba
1002 – Otto-Henry, Duke of Burgundy (b. 946)
1080 – Rudolf of Rheinfelden (b. 1025)
1173 – Petronilla of Aragon (b. 1135)
1240 – Razia Sultana, sultan of Delhi (b. 1205)
1243 – Hedwig of Silesia, Polish saint (b. 1174)
1326 – Walter de Stapledon, English bishop and politician, Lord High Treasurer (b. 1261)
1385 – Dionysius I, Metropolitan of Moscow
1389 – Pope Urban VI (b. 1318)
1404 – Marie Valois, French princess (b. 1344)
1496 – Gilbert, Count of Montpensier (b. 1443)
1564 – Andreas Vesalius, Belgian-Greek anatomist, physician, and author (b. 1514)

1601–1900
1674 – Robert Herrick, English poet (b. 1591) 
1684 – Géraud de Cordemoy, French historian, philosopher and lawyer (b. 1626)
1690 – Juan de Valdés Leal, Spanish painter and illustrator (b. 1622) 
1715 – Humphry Ditton, English mathematician and  philosopher (b. 1675)
1788 – Samuel Greig, Scottish-Russian admiral (b. 1735)
1810 – Alfred Moore, American captain and judge (b. 1755)
1811 – Nathaniel Dance-Holland, English painter and politician (b. 1735)
1817 – Tadeusz Kościuszko, Polish-Lithuanian general and engineer (b. 1746)
1819 – Sergey Vyazmitinov, Russian general and politician, War Governor of Saint Petersburg (b. 1744)
1820 – Karl Philipp, Prince of Schwarzenberg (b. 1771)
1837 – Ivan Dmitriev, Russian poet and politician, Russian Minister of Justice (b. 1760)
1838 – Letitia Elizabeth Landon, English poet and novelist (b. 1802)
1891 – Gilbert Arthur à Beckett, English author and songwriter (b. 1837)
1900 – Zdeněk Fibich, Czech pianist and composer (b. 1850)

1901–present
1910 – Stanley Ketchel, American boxer (b. 1886)
1917 – Mata Hari, Dutch dancer and spy (b. 1876)
1918 – Sai Baba of Shirdi, Indian guru and saint (b. 1838)
1925 – Dolores Jiménez y Muro, Mexican revolutionary (b. 1848?)
1930 – Herbert Henry Dow, Canadian-American businessman, founded the Dow Chemical Company (b. 1866)
1934 – Raymond Poincaré, French lawyer and politician, 10th President of France (b. 1860)
1940 – Lluís Companys, Catalan lawyer and politician, President of Catalonia (b. 1882)
1945 – Pierre Laval, French lawyer and politician, 101st Prime Minister of France (b. 1883)
1946 – Hermann Göring, German general and politician (b. 1893)
1948 – Edythe Chapman, American actress (b. 1863)
1955 – Fumio Hayasaka, Japanese composer (b. 1914)
1958 – Asaf Halet Çelebi, Turkish poet and author (b. 1907)
  1958   – Elizabeth Alexander, British geologist, academic, and physicist (b. 1908)
1959 – Stepan Bandera, Ukrainian soldier and politician (b. 1909)
  1959   – Lipót Fejér, Hungarian mathematician and academic (b. 1880)
1960 – Clara Kimball Young, American actress and producer (b. 1890)
1961 – Suryakant Tripathi 'Nirala', Indian poet and author (b. 1896)
1963 – Horton Smith, American golfer and captain (b. 1908)
1964 – Cole Porter, American composer and songwriter (b. 1891)
1965 – Abraham Fraenkel, German-Israeli mathematician and academic (b. 1891)
1966 – Frederick Montague, 1st Baron Amwell, English lieutenant and politician (b. 1876)
1968 – Virginia Lee Burton, American author and illustrator (b. 1909)
1976 – Carlo Gambino, Italian-American mob boss (b. 1902)
1978 – W. Eugene Smith, American photojournalist (b. 1918)
1980 – Mikhail Lavrentyev, Russian physicist and mathematician (b. 1900)
  1980   – Apostolos Nikolaidis, Greek footballer and volleyball player (b. 1896)
1983 – Pat O'Brien, American actor (b. 1899)
1987 – Thomas Sankara, Burkinabe captain and politician, 5th President of Burkina Faso (b. 1949)
  1987   – Donald Wandrei, American author and poet (b. 1908)
1988 – Kaikhosru Shapurji Sorabji, English composer, music critic, pianist and writer (b. 1892)
1989 – Danilo Kiš, Serbian novelist, short story writer, essayist and translator. (b. 1935)
1990 – Delphine Seyrig, French actress and director (b. 1932)
1993 – Aydın Sayılı, Turkish historian and academic (b. 1913)
1994 – Sarah Kofman, French philosopher and academic (b. 1934)
1995 – Bengt Åkerblom, Swedish ice hockey player (b. 1967)
  1995   – Marco Campos, Brazilian racing driver, only driver ever killed in the International Formula 3000 series (b. 1976)
1999 – Josef Locke, British-Irish soldier, policeman, tenor and actor (b. 1917)
2000 – Konrad Emil Bloch, Polish-American biochemist and academic, Nobel Prize laureate (b. 1912) 
  2000   – Vincent Canby, American journalist and critic (b. 1924)
2001 – Chang Hsüeh-liang, Chinese general and warlord (b. 1901)
2003 – Ben Metcalfe, Canadian journalist and activist (b. 1919)
2004 – Per Højholt, Danish poet (b. 1928)
2005 – Jason Collier, American basketball player (b. 1977)
  2005   – Matti Wuori, Finnish lawyer and politician (b. 1945)
2007 – Piet Boukema, Dutch jurist and politician (b. 1933)
2008 – Edie Adams, American actress and singer (b. 1927)
  2008   – Fazıl Hüsnü Dağlarca, Turkish soldier and poet (b. 1914)
  2008   – Jack Narz, American game show host and announcer (b. 1922)
2009 – Heinz Versteeg, Dutch-German footballer (b. 1939)
2010 – Richard C. Miller, American photographer (b. 1912)
  2010   – Mildred Fay Jefferson, American physician and activist (b. 1926)
  2010   – Johnny Sheffield, American actor (b. 1931)
2011 – Betty Driver, English actress, singer, and author (b. 1920)
2012 – Claude Cheysson, French lieutenant and politician, French Minister of Foreign Affairs (b. 1920)
  2012   – Erol Günaydın, Turkish actor and screenwriter (b. 1933)
  2012   – Maria Petrou, Greek-English computer scientist and academic (b. 1953)
  2012   – Norodom Sihanouk, Cambodian politician, 1st Prime Minister of Cambodia (b. 1922)
  2012   – Pat Ward, American lawyer and politician (b. 1957)
2013 – Donald Bailey, American drummer (b. 1933)
  2013   – Nevill Drury, English-Australian journalist and publisher (b. 1947)
  2013   – Cancio Garcia, Filipino lawyer and jurist (b. 1937)
  2013   – Gloria Lynne, American singer (b. 1931)
  2013   – Rudy Minarcin, American baseball player and coach (b. 1930)
  2013   – Hans Riegel, German businessman (b. 1923)
2014 – Giovanni Reale, Italian philosopher and historian (b. 1931)
  2014   – Jiří Reynek, Czech poet and graphic designer (b. 1929)
  2014   – Robert Tiernan, American lawyer and politician (b. 1929)
  2014   – Nobby Wirkowski, American-Canadian football player and coach (b. 1926)
2015 – Sergei Filippenkov, Russian footballer and manager (b. 1971)
  2015   – Nate Huffman, American basketball player (b. 1975)
  2015   – Neill Sheridan, American baseball player (b. 1921)
  2015   – Kenneth D. Taylor, Canadian businessman and diplomat (b. 1934)
  2015   – Tyrone Young, American football player (b. 1960)
2017 – Chinggoy Alonzo, Filipino theater, movie & television actor (b. 1950)
2018 – Paul Allen, co-founder of Microsoft, philanthropist, owner of the Seattle Seahawks (b. 1953)
2021 – David Amess, British politician, member of Parliament for Southend West (b. 1952)

Holidays and observances
Anniversary of the 1987 Coup d'État (Burkina Faso)
Breast Health Day (Europe)
Christian feast day:
Bruno of Querfurt
Cúan of Ahascragh
Teresa of Ávila 
Thecla of Kitzingen
October 15 (Eastern Orthodox liturgics)
Evacuation Day (Tunisia)
King Father's Commemoration Day (Cambodia)
National Latino AIDS Awareness Day (United States)
Shwmae Su'mae Day (Wales)

References

External links

 
 
 

Days of the year
October